Provincetown Harbor is a large natural harbor located in the town of Provincetown, Massachusetts.

A tall green buoy east of Long Point (i.e., the tip of Cape Cod) marks the entrance to Provincetown Harbor from Cape Cod Bay.

Geology

Most of Cape Cod was created by the Laurentide Glacier between 18,000 and 15,000 years ago. However, the Provincetown Spit, i.e., the land surrounding Provincetown Harbor from High Head in North Truro through all of Provincetown, consists largely of marine deposits transported from farther up the shore during the last 6,000 years.

History

A stone wall discovered in Provincetown in 1805 is thought to have been built by Viking Thorvald Eiriksson about AD 1007, when according to Norse sagas, the keel of Ericson's ship was repaired in the harbor.

Bartholomew Gosnold explored the harbor in 1602, and his mate Gabriel Archer wrote: "The fifteenth day of May we had again sight of the land, which made ahead, being as we thought an island, by reason of a large sound that appeared westward between it and the main, for coming to the west end thereof, we did perceive a large opening, we called it Shoal Hope. Near this cape we came to anchor in fifteen fathoms, where we took great store of codfish, for which we altered the name, and called it Cape Cod. Here we saw sculls of herring, mackerel, and other small fish, in great abundance. This is a low sandy shoal, but without danger..."

John Smith explored the harbor in 1614 and wrote: "Cape Cod... is only a headland of high hills of sand, overgrown with shrubby pines, hurts, and such trash, but an excellent harbor for all weathers. This Cape is made by the main sea on the one side, and a great bay on the other, in form of a sickle..."

Pilgrims' first landing

Provincetown Harbor was the initial anchoring place of the Pilgrims traveling on the Mayflower in 1620, before they proceeded to Plymouth, Massachusetts. Thoreau later observed that Smith's description of the harbor may have been less colored by the hardships of transoceanic troubles than the Pilgrims'. Mourt's Relation describes the harbor as:

The Mayflower held several different passengers in addition to the Pilgrims on its first transoceanic voyage. Before coming ashore at the extreme northwest corner of the harbor, the Pilgrims and other settlers signed the Mayflower Compact in the harbor on November 11, 1620. Dorothy Bradford, the first wife of William Bradford, was one of the first adult Pilgrims to die in the New World. According to the only known written description of her death from close to when it actually occurred, she fell overboard from the Mayflower in Provincetown Harbor on December 17, 1620 and drowned. Peregrine White, the first child born to the Pilgrims in New England, was born while they were in Provincetown Harbor.

Village of Long Point

From 1818 until the 1850s a fishing village existed at Long Point, complete with a post office, schoolhouse, 6 windmills for saltworks, and 38 homes for about 200 adults and 60 children.  When the families left in the 1850s, they floated their homes a mile across the harbor, where many still stand today.

During the American Civil War, the military established defensive artillery battery positions at this location. The Long Point Battery would come to be known as "Fort Useless" and "Fort Ridiculous" by the local residents.

Today, Long Point is a ghost village, and nothing remains save for the Long Point Light, which had been replaced by a new light in 1875.

East Harbor
For the better part of modern history, the eastern part of Provincetown harbor was connected to yet another harbor, historically known as East Harbor. East Harbor was the most protected mooring place in the outer Cape for boats using Cape Cod Bay and the Gulf of Maine. East Harbor had a  inlet from Provincetown Harbor, as shown in the adjacent map from 1836.

Until the late 19th century, there was not a single road leading in or out of Provincetown – the only land route connecting Provincetown to points beyond was along a thin stretch of beach along the shore to the north (locally called the "backshore").  A wooden bridge was erected over the East Harbor in 1854, only to be destroyed by a winter storm and ice two years later.  Although the bridge was replaced the following year, a traveler using it still had to traverse several miles over a sand route, which, along with the backshore route, would occasionally be washed out by storms.  This made Provincetown much like an island, in that it relied almost entirely upon its harbor for its communication, travel, and commerce needs.

In 1868 the mouth of the East Harbor was diked, to facilitate the laying of track for the arrival of the railroad; the wooden bridge and sand road were finally replaced by a formal roadway in 1877, as shown in the accompanying map from 1887.  The East Harbor thus became a lake, connected to Provincetown Harbor only through a culvert in the dike, and in 1910, the U.S. Geologic Survey (USGS) officially renamed it Pilgrim Lake.

In the ensuing years, the dike became clogged with vegetation, beginning a trend of desalination and oxygen-depletion that resulted in the demise of native wildlife populations, occasionally in the form of fish kills. In 2004, tidal flow was successfully restored by the National Park Service, working together with other local, state, and federal agencies. In the following year, for the first time since Abraham Lincoln was president, legal-size clams were found in East Harbor.  In 2008, the USGS officially renamed Pilgrim Lake, restoring the original appellation of East Harbor.

Other history
The Portland gale of 1898 destroyed several wharves and fishing vessels within the harbor.

In 2002, Provincetown Harbor Beach was selected by the US Environmental Protection Agency as one of three Flagship beaches for the state of Massachusetts that serve as models for beach managers in water quality monitoring and pollution assessments and because of its health.

The harbor is the southern boundary of the Provincetown historic district, which is on the National Register of Historic Places.

Landmarks
Two main parallel wharves dominated the center of the harbor in the late 19th century: Railroad Wharf and Steamboat Wharf. President Grant visited Provincetown for the opening of the railroad in 1874. Today, the wharves have been replaced by piers. Although rail and steamboat service to Provincetown both ended long ago, ferry service continues.

MacMillan Pier, the town pier of Provincetown, was significantly renovated and expanded during 2003-2005 with the help of a $1.95 million low interest loan from the Rural Development program of the U.S. Department of Agriculture. The pier primarily serves tourists and high-speed ferries to Boston and Plymouth that charge their passengers up to $44 per one-way trip. The Provincetown Public Pier Corporation  (PPPC) entered into a 20-year lease agreement for MacMillan Pier operations in 2005. The pier is named after arctic explorer Donald B. MacMillan, a Provincetown native who retired to Provincetown and died there in 1970.

Immediately parallel to MacMillan Pier is Fisherman's Wharf, also known to locals as Cabral's Pier. They Also Faced the Sea is an outdoor art installation of five large portraits of local Portuguese-American women photographed by Norma Holt hanging since 2003 on one side and one end of the old fish-packing plant on Cabral Pier.

In both 1907 and 1910, when the Pilgrim Monument began construction and when it was dedicated, the entire Atlantic fleet of the U.S. Navy was inside the harbor for large ceremonies led by Presidents Theodore Roosevelt and William Howard Taft, respectively.

In addition to a panoramic view of the whole town, the harbor affords views of three working lighthouses: Long Point Light, Wood End Light, and Highland (or Cape Cod) Light. All three are on land within the Cape Cod National Seashore.

On the East End of Provincetown, Lewis Wharf was purchased by Mary Heaton Vorse, and its old fish shack converted into a theater which became the home of the Provincetown Players. Eugene O'Neill debuted his first play, Bound East for Cardiff, there in 1916.

Captain Jack's Wharf is on the West End of Provincetown. 

U.S. Coast Guard has administrative buildings and barracks at the base of a concrete pier on the harbor. Noteworthy past disasters within this station's area include the wreck of the submarine S-4 in 1927. This station includes the first federal building to receive solar power. A frequent sight in the harbor is the station's 47-foot Motor Lifeboat.

The West End Breakwater, built in 1911 by the US Army Corps of Engineers, is open to the public for walking and exploring. Technically speaking, it is more of a dike than a breakwater.

Marine life
Provincetown Harbor supports a wide variety of marine life from algae, seagrasses and plankton through bryozoa, hydroids, echinoderms, crustaceans, mollusks, fish, birds, marine mammals, and other animals.

The harbor is an amazingly diverse and productive habitat. The following tables list in no particular order 94 examples of marine life that are regularly observed within the harbor. A few landbirds are included that are common around MacMillan Pier, on the beaches, and on the breakwater.

Historic annual events
The Great Provincetown Schooner Regatta each September preserves the harbor's history as a great sailing port.

A Blessing of the Fleet ceremony is held at the end of MacMillan Pier in late June, when all the boats operating in the harbor are blessed by a visiting bishop as part of the Provincetown Portuguese Festival.

The Swim for Life occurs each September since 1988, which is a swim across the harbor to raise funds and awareness of HIV/AIDS, women's health and community health.

Commercial use

Roughly a dozen fishing trawlers (locally known as "draggers"), ferries to Boston and Plymouth, Massachusetts, several different sportfishing boats, boat rentals, and other commercial boats also use the harbor today.

East Coast whale watching on Stellwagen Bank originated as a joint effort of the Dolphin Fleet and the Center for Coastal Studies leaving from MacMillan Pier in 1975.  In addition, other tour boat operators offer a variety of tours of and from the harbor, including historical sightseeing tours, harbor marine life tours, sunset cruises and more.

Further reading and other information
 Wikipedia List of Nationally Registered Historic Places in Provincetown
 Oldale, R. N., 1992, Cape Cod and the Islands, the geologic story: Parnassus Imprints, East Orleans, Massachusetts, 208 p. see Geologic History of Cape Cod, Massachusetts
 Carl Christian Rafn, 1837. Antiquitates Americanæ. referred to by The Norse Wall House
 Strahler, A. N., 1966, A Geologist's View of Cape Cod: Doubleday. Reprinted Parnassus Imprints (1988), Orleans, Massachusetts, 115 p.
 Vorse, M.H.  Time and the Town: A Provincetown Chronicle. 1942. Dial Press, New York, 372 p.
 a Norma Holt exhibit in "Faces & Places"
 "Shutterbug" 1999 interview with Norma Holt
 Things to Do compiled by Provincetown Public Pier Corporation
 Provincetown Chamber of Commerce has information about annual events, plus tourist information such as cruises and tours of the harbor.
 old postcard of Captain Jack's wharf in West End

External links
 WikiMapia aerial view showing several landmarks

References

Ports and harbors of Massachusetts
Geography of Barnstable County, Massachusetts
Transportation in Barnstable County, Massachusetts
Massachusetts natural resources
Provincetown, Massachusetts
Bays of Massachusetts